Thrichocalydon havrylenkoi is a species of beetle in the family Cerambycidae, the only species in the genus Thrichocalydon.

References

Callidiini
Monotypic beetle genera